Beishanyang is a village located in , Laiwu District, Jinan, Shandong Province of the People's Republic of China.

References

Villages in China